The Enschede fireworks disaster was a catastrophic fireworks explosion on 13 May 2000 in Enschede, the Netherlands. The explosion killed 23 people including four firefighters and injured nearly 1,000. A total of 400 homes were destroyed and 1,500 buildings damaged.

Fire crews were called in from across the border in Germany to help battle the blaze; it was brought under control by the end of the day.

S.E. Fireworks was a major supplier to pop concerts and major festive events in the Netherlands. Prior to the disaster it had a good safety record and met all safety audits.

Cause

It then spread outside the building to two full shipping containers that were being used to illegally store more display incendiaries. When  of fireworks exploded, it destroyed the surrounding residential area.<ref name="vt">Online Oosting zag iets over het hoofd in Enschede, NRC Handelsblad, 23 March 2001</em></ref>

One theory to explain the large scale of the disaster was that internal fire doors in the central complex—which might otherwise have contained the fire—had been left open. Theoretically, an explosion was considered highly unlikely because the fireworks were stored in sealed bunkers specifically designed to minimize such risk. However, the illegal use of shipping containers reduced safety, particularly as they had been arranged closely together at ground level and had not been separated either by earthworks or other partitioning.

One week prior to the explosion, SE had been audited. The company was judged to have met all official safety regulations while the legally imported fireworks had been inspected by Dutch authorities and deemed safe. However, after the explosion, residents from the affected district of Roombeek—a poor, working-class neighbourhood—complained of government inaction and lack of interest, saying the whole disaster was just waiting to happen.

When it was built in 1977, the warehouse was outside the town, but as new residential areas were built it became surrounded by low-income housing. Residents and town councillors stated they did not even know that there was a fireworks warehouse in their area. Later in the court case, the judge said that city officials failed to take steps even when they knew laws had been broken. They acted "completely incomprehensibly" by allowing the company to expand, for fear that the city would have to pay the cost of moving S.E. Fireworks to another location.

Damage
A  area around the warehouse was destroyed by the blast. Enschede was built around the S.E. Fireworks factory, which was the only one in the Netherlands to be located in a residential area. This caused around 400 houses to be destroyed, 15 streets incinerated and a total of 1,500 homes damaged, leaving 1,250 people homeless, essentially obliterating the neighbourhood of Roombeek. Ten thousand residents were evacuated, and damages eventually exceeded 1 billion guilders (€454 million).

The Dutch Government warned that potentially harmful asbestos was released into the air by the explosion. The fire spread to the nearby Grolsch Beer brewery which had an asbestos roof. It was later demolished and closed; a replacement opened close by in Boekelo in 2004.

Healthcare impact
In 2005 a survey was published based on the electronic medical records of general practitioners, which compared 9,329 victims with a control sample size of 7,329 units ranging from 16 months before to 2.5 years after the disaster.

The study highlighted that "two and a half years post-disaster the prevalence of psychological problems in victims, who had to relocate, was about double and in the non-relocated victims one-third more than controls". Relocated victims showed the highest increase of medically unexplained physical symptoms (tiredness, headache, nausea, and abdominal pain) and of gastrointestinal morbidity.

Legal proceedings
On 20 May Dutch authorities issued an international arrest warrant for the two managers of the company, Rudi Bakker and Willie Pater, after they fled their homes, which were empty when searched. Willie Pater handed himself in on the same day, and Rudi Bakker the day after.

In April 2002, the owners were sentenced to six months' imprisonment each for violation of environmental and safety regulations and dealing in illegal fireworks alongside a fine of €2,250 each. However, they were both acquitted of the more serious charges of negligence for the fire.

In May 2003, Arnhem Appeals Court acquitted 36-year-old André de Vries of arson. Almelo Court had originally (May 2002) tried and convicted De Vries of arson and sentenced him to 15 years imprisonment.

In February 2005, after a four-and-a-half-year legal battle, the six-month sentence of each of the owners was increased to twelve months each.

A total of €8.5m in compensation was awarded to the victims of the explosion, according to the organisation in charge of distributing the compensation, the UPV, having assessed 3,519 claims.  Three hundred people received cash for incurring extra costs, 136 people received money for loss of income, and 1,477 people received compensation for health problems.

Dutch fire safety regulations

The S.E. Fireworks disaster led to intensified safety regulations in the Netherlands concerning the storage and sale of fireworks. The Roombeek area that was destroyed by the blast has since been rebuilt. Since the catastrophe, three illegal fireworks depots were closed down in the Netherlands.

Memorials
There have been annual public memorial services in Roombeek since 2000 led by the mayor Jan Mans, and commonly ending on the Stroinksbleekweg. The theme of 2004 was "homecoming".

In popular culture
 The events of the disaster served as the inspiration of the mission "Explosion in fireworks factory" from Emergency 4: Global Fighters for Life. In the mission, negligent handling and stockpiling of extremely volatile fireworks near a damaged fuse box led to a devastating explosion with numerous casualties while starting multiple fires. In addition to standard emergency responses, the player is tasked with arresting the factory's CEO, mirroring the Dutch authorities' arrest warrant for factory managers.

See also
1654 Delft gunpowder explosion
Leiden gunpowder disaster
2000 in the Netherlands
List of fireworks accidents and incidents
List of industrial disasters

References

External links
 
In pictures: Firework blaze – BBC News
Satellite Map Imagery – Google Maps

Explosions in 2000
Explosions in the Netherlands
Fireworks accidents and incidents
2000 industrial disasters
2000 in the Netherlands
2000 fires in Europe
Industrial fires and explosions
Events in Enschede
History of Overijssel
May 2000 events in Europe
Warehouse fires
Building and structure fires in the Netherlands
2000 disasters in the Netherlands